Reset-Dialogues on Civilizations is an association founded in 2005 with the purpose of promoting dialogue between different cultures through seminars, international conferences, educational activities, publications, translations and an online magazine called ResetDOC (www.resetdoc.org). ResetDOC is published in English and Italian, with some articles in other languages, such as Arabic. Reset was founded by Nina zu Fürstenberg (president) and Giancarlo Bosetti (director) with a board of directors that includes Francesco Micheli (vice president), Piergaetano Marchetti, Georg Heinrich Thyssen-Bornemisza (honorary president and former association president) and Giuliano Amato (president of the scientific committee). Reset is based in Rome. In 2010, a legally recognized partner association was founded in the United States.

Within the framework of the defense of human rights, this association’s stated objective is to oppose the concept of cultural, racial and religious conflicts, encourage better reciprocal knowledge between people belonging to different cultures, in particular between the East and the West, between Islamic and Western countries and also support policies for the integration of immigrants. The association was founded in cooperation with the Italian bi-monthly political-cultural magazine “Reset” of which Giancarlo Bosetti is editor-in-chief, but has developed at an international level with publications in English (special editions of Philosophy&Social Criticism, SAGE publications, in 2010 and 2011, a special issue of the Indian magazine Seminar, May 2011), in Italian (the collection ‘Libri di Reset-Marsilio’) and with conferences, lectures and seminars held in Egypt, Turkey, Morocco, Qatar, Switzerland, India and Italy.

The members of Reset’s scientific committee are:
Giuliano Amato (President), Abdullahi Ahmed An-Na'im, Abdou Filali-Ansary, Seyla Benhabib, Giancarlo Bosetti, Fred Dallmayr, Silvio Fagiolo, Maria Teresa Fumagalli Beonio Brocchieri, Nina zu Fürstenberg, Timothy Garton Ash, Anthony Giddens, Vartan Gregorian, Lorenzo Guolo, Hassan Hanafi, Roman Herzog, Ramin Jahanbegloo, Jörg Lau, Amos Luzzatto, Avishai Margalit, Krzysztof Michalski, Andrea Riccardi, Olivier Roy, Otto Schily, Karel Schwarzenberg, Roberto Toscano, Bassam Tibi, Nadia Urbinati, Umberto Veronesi, Michael Walzer.
Nasr Hamid Abu Zayd was a member of Reset from the time it was founded until his death in July 2010.

References

External links
 www.resetdoc.org, Reset-Dialogues on Civilizations' online magazine
 Top thinkers interviews by resetdoc.org

Peace organizations